Alfred Pearse (20 May 1855 – 1933), also known as A Patriot, was an English artist, author, campaigner and inventor. Pearse, born at St Pancras, London, was a fourth generation artist and son of celebrated decorative artist Joseph Salter Pearse (1822–1896) and Loveday Colbron (1825–1895). He studied at West London School of Art and gained numerous prizes for drawing.

As special artist and correspondent to The Sphere, he was assigned to the Duke and Duchess of Cornwall and York's 1901 tour of New Zealand.

Pearse designed posters campaigning for women's suffrage. He drew a weekly cartoon for Votes for Women from 1909, and was also regularly published in The Illustrated London News, Boy's Own Paper and Punch. With Laurence Housman, he set up the Suffrage Atelier. 

Pearse produced various artworks, cartoons and propaganda related to British efforts in World War I. From 11 September 1918 to March 1919, he held an honorary captain's commission in the New Zealand Rifle Brigade, NZEF, as official artist, painting the battle scenes in which the 1st NZRB figured. He was attached to Brigadier General Charles Melvill's headquarters and left London for France on 27 September 1918.

He was a wood engraver, book illustrator and art critic, including for the Manchester Guardian, and for eight years had been a member of Joseph Barnby's Royal Choral Society. 

Amongst his inventions, he'd patented improvements to vehicle and cycle wheels, improvements relating to the frames of velocipedes, a method for animating advertising hoardings in 1908–1912, improvements in flying machines, devised a model air-ship for the October 1905 readers of The Boy's Own Paper and a method of preserving shores. 

His son Denis Colbron Pearse (1883–1971) also was an illustrator.

Gallery

References

External links
 
 
 

1855 births
1933 deaths
English cartoonists
English illustrators
British illustrators
British children's book illustrators
English children's book illustrators
Political artists
New Zealand Rifle Brigade (Earl of Liverpool's Own)